Peter Stanley Sampson (9 July 1927 – 16 May 2009) was a professional footballer, who spent his entire Football League career with Bristol Rovers, and who also went on to play for Trowbridge Town after retiring from the professional game.

Sampson was born in Great Wakering, in Essex, and attended Great Wakering School, for whom he once scored 72 goals in a single season. He initially trained as a butcher, before being called up to the army and stationed in West Africa during World War II. He bought himself out of the army for £65, and returned to England to sign as an amateur for Bristol Rovers. He turned professional with the club in 1948, and had a thirteen-year-long career with them, making 340 league appearances and scoring four goals during that spell. He moved to Trowbridge Town in 1961, where he stayed for two years before taking over as assistant manager of his former youth club, Oldland.

Away from football, Sampson had run a poultry business with his Bristol Rovers teammate Vic Lambden while playing in Bristol, and after his retirement from the sport he worked as a gardener and a milkman in his adopted home town of Cadbury Heath.

Towards the end of his life he was diagnosed with Alzheimer's disease, and spent his last few years living at a nursing home in Congresbury near Bristol. He died on 16 May 2009, aged 81.

He was the cousin of former Chelsea player Les Stubbs.

References

1927 births
2009 deaths
British Army soldiers
Military personnel from Essex
Neurological disease deaths in England
Deaths from Alzheimer's disease
People from Rochford District
English footballers
Association football midfielders
English Football League players
Bristol Rovers F.C. players
Trowbridge Town F.C. players
British Army personnel of World War II